Ģikši is a village in Amata Municipality, Latvia and the capital of Amata Parish.

References

Towns and villages in Latvia